Laura Granville  (born May 12, 1981) is a former American professional tennis player. During the two years she spent at Stanford University, she set the record for most consecutive singles victories with 58 and finished with an overall record of 93–3. Granville won the NCAA Championship in singles as well as the ITA Player of the Year in both 2000 and 2001.

In 2001, Stanford won the women's tennis national team championship, and Granville was also a doubles finalist. She retired in 2010 after seven full years on the WTA Tour and returned to Stanford, where she completed her studies and graduated in 2012. She was inducted into the Stanford University Athletics Hall of Fame in 2014.

Granville is now in her sixth season as the head coach of the Princeton University women's tennis team.  In 2014, the Princeton women's tennis program won the Ivy League title and defeated Arizona State 4–3 to win its first-ever NCAA tournament match.

Career highlights
1996—Won the Illinois girl's high school tennis state singles championships as a sophomore at The Latin School of Chicago.

1998—Claimed the USTA National Girls' 18 Singles and earned a wildcard into the US Open main draw, losing in the second round (defeating world No. 96 Paola Suárez en route.)

1999—Repeated as the USTA National Girls' 18 Singles and earned a wildcard into the US Open main draw.

2000—Won the National Collegiate Athletics Association (NCAA) women's singles championship as a freshman at Stanford University.

2001—Won the Honda Sports Award as the nation's best female tennis player

2001—Won her second consecutive NCAA singles championship as a sophomore at Stanford University.  

2001—Turned professional after her sophomore year and reached three ITF Circuit semifinals.

2002—Won two ITF tournaments, was the runner-up in two ITF tournaments, reached her first-ever WTA Tour quarterfinals in New Haven, U.S. and Luxembourg (beating Arantxa Sánchez Vicario in the first round), won three singles matches at Wimbledon (including a defeat of Mary Pierce), reached the third round at the tournament in Montreal, and made her top 100 and top 50 debuts.

2007—Defeated former world No. 1, Martina Hingis, in the third round at Wimbledon to match her career best showing there. Defeated 2013 Wimbledon Champion Marion Bartoli indoors at Memphis.

2008—Won the Midland, Michigan, U.S. ITF tournament.

WTA career finals

Singles: 1 (runner-up)

Doubles: 5 (2 titles, 3 runner-ups)

ITF Circuit finals

Singles: 15 (9–6)

Doubles: 9 (6–3)

References

External links
 
 
 

1981 births
Living people
American female tennis players
Latin School of Chicago alumni
Stanford Cardinal women's tennis players
Tennis players from Chicago
Princeton Tigers women's tennis coaches
American tennis coaches